The 2021–22 Arizona State Sun Devils men's basketball team represented Arizona State University during the 2021–22 NCAA Division I men's basketball season. The Sun Devils were led by seventh-year head coach Bobby Hurley, and played their home games at Desert Financial Arena in Tempe, Arizona as members of the Pac–12 Conference.

Previous season
The Sun Devils finished the season 11–14, 7–10 in Pac-12 play to finish in ninth place. They defeated Washington State in the first round before losing in the quarterfinals of the Pac-12 tournament to Oregon.

Off-season

Departures

Incoming transfers
{| class="wikitable sortable" style="font-size:100%;" border="1"
! Name
! Num.
! Pos.
! Height
! Weight
! Year 
! Previous School
!! class="unsortable" | Notes
|-
| DJ Horne || 0 || G || 6'1" || 175 || Junior || Raleigh, NC || Transferred from Illinois State.
|-
| Marreon Jackson || 3 || G || 6'1" || 190 || Graduate Student || Cleveland, OH || Transferred from Toledo. Will be eligible to play immediately since Jackson graduated from Toledo.
|-
| Jay Heath || 5 || G || 6'3" || 195 || Junior || Washington, D.C. || Transferred from Boston College.
|-
| Alonzo Gaffney || 32 || F/C || 6'9" || 200 || Junior || Cleveland, OH || Junior college transferred from Northwest Florida State College
|-
| Chase Courtney || 40 || F || 6'10 || 230 || Sophomore || Scottsdale, AZ || Transferred from San Jose State
|}

2021 recruiting class

Roster

Schedule and results

|-
!colspan=12 style=| Exhibition

|-
!colspan=12 style=| Regular season

|-
!colspan=12 style=| Pac-12 tournament

|-

Source:

Rankings*The preseason and week 1 polls were the same.^Coaches poll was not released for Week 2.''

Notes

References

Arizona State Sun Devils men's basketball seasons
Arizona State
Arizona State Sun Devils men's basketball
Arizona State Sun Devils men's basketball